Rybovodny is a rural locality (a settlement) in Kirovskoye Rural Settlement, Sredneakhtubinsky District, Volgograd Oblast, Russia. The population was 162 as of 2010. There are 4 streets.

Geography 
Rybovodny is located west of the Gniloy Erik, south from Zelyony Island, 25 km northwest of Srednyaya Akhtuba (the district's administrative centre) by road. Prikanalny is the nearest rural locality.

References 

Rural localities in Sredneakhtubinsky District